Zay is both a given name and a surname. Notable people with the name include:

Zay Flowers (born 2000), American football player
Zay Harding (born 1974), American television personality
Zay Jones (born 1995), American football player
Adele Zay (1848–1928), Transylvanian teacher and feminist
Anna Zay, Hungarian writer
Gözde Zay, Turkish fashion model
Jean Zay (1904-1944), French politician
William Zay, American baseball player